Scene It all is an album by the progressive bluegrass Maryland band the Seldom Scene, released in 2000. Ben Eldridge re-recruited Lou Reid, this time on mandolin, to replace John Duffey, who died in 1996.

Critical reception
Exclaim! wrote that "it's undeniably good, but that last intangible, that spark that kicks something over the top from damn good and into truly great, is missing."

Track listing
 Rollin' and Tumblin' (Morganfield, Muddy Waters) 4:07
 Dusty (Norris) 3:32
 I Will Always Be Waiting for You (McReynolds, McReynolds) 2:43
 Blue and Lonesome (Monroe, Williams) 2:59
 You Better Get Right (Smith, Smith) 2:19
 Walking the Dog (Grishen, Pierce) 2:45
 From This Moment On (Bonnie Guitar) 3:40
 When the Walls Come Tumblin' Down (Graham, Jackson, Laney) 2:50
 Boots of Spanish Leather (Bob Dylan) 4:51
 Trust in the Tide (Mendelsohn) 3:10
 One Step Up (Bruce Springsteen) 3:46
 Nadine (Chuck Berry) 3:39 A » From This Moment On (Bonnie Guitar) 2:06 (Hidden track)A

AA rehearsal recording of "From This Moment On" with only the first verse and chorus is included at the end of Track 12; total track length is 6:58, including 1:03 (1 minute : 3 seconds) of silence in between "Nadine" and "From This Moment On."

Personnel
 Dudley Connell - vocals, guitar, mandolin
 Lou Reid - mandolin, vocals
 Ben Eldridge - banjo, guitar, vocals
 Fred Travers - Dobro, guitar, vocals
 Ronnie Simpkins - bass, vocals

References

External links
Official site

2000 albums
The Seldom Scene albums
Sugar Hill Records albums